Marble Head is a historic home located at Ridgely, Caroline County, Maryland, United States. It is a two-story, three-part stuccoed brick house that was apparently built in stages between 1803 and 1820. It has nearly complete interior finishes dating to the early 19th century.

Marble Head was listed on the National Register of Historic Places in 2002.

References

External links
, including photo from 1999, at Maryland Historical Trust

Houses in Caroline County, Maryland
Houses on the National Register of Historic Places in Maryland
Federal architecture in Maryland
Houses completed in 1820
National Register of Historic Places in Caroline County, Maryland